The Glitter Dome is a 1984 American made-for-HBO crime drama film starring James Garner, Margot Kidder and John Lithgow.  The film, based on the 1981 Joseph Wambaugh Hollywood-set homicide novel of the same name, was directed by Stuart Margolin, who also scored the film and played a supporting part.  The movie was filmed in Victoria, British Columbia and co-starred Colleen Dewhurst.  It was subsequently released on video in 1985. The film was also the last film for John Marley.

Synopsis
The Glitter Dome is a bar frequented by the Hollywood police detective division (the name is a slang reference to Hollywood). When the investigation of a high-profile studio president is going nowhere, the case is handed over to two experienced detectives, Al Mackey (Garner) and Marty Welborn (Lithgow). For this case, however, they need help, which they receive from a pair of vice cops called the Ferret and the Weasel and a pair of street cops commonly referred to as the Street Monsters, due to their fondness for violence.

Cast
 James Garner as Sergeant Aloysius Mackey 
 Margot Kidder as Willie 
 John Lithgow as Sergeant Marty Wellborn 
 John Marley as Captain Woofer 
 Stuart Margolin as Herman Sinclair 
 Paul Koslo as Griswold Veals 
 Colleen Dewhurst as Lorna Dillman 
 Alek Diakun as "Weasel" 
 Billy Kerr as "Ferret" 
 William S. Taylor as "Hand"
 Dusty Morean as Phipps 
 Christianne Hirt as Jill 
 Tom McBeath as Farrell 
 Dixie Seatle as Grace "Amazing Grace"
 Dawn Luker as Gladys 
 Harvey Miller as Harvey Himmelfarb 
 Enid Saunders as Eleanor St. Denis 
 Alistair MacDuff as Malcolm Sinclair 
 Max Martini as Steven
 Benson Fong as Wing 
 Dale Wilson as Lloyd / Bozeman

References

External links
 

1984 crime drama films
Films based on American novels
American crime drama films
Films set in Los Angeles
Films shot in Vancouver
HBO Films films
1984 films
1984 television films
1980s English-language films
Films directed by Stuart Margolin
1980s American films